IRAO may refer to:
Incubateur Régional d'Afrique de l'Ouest
Irish Republican Army Organisation